Bridgit Mendler: Live in Concert is the debut concert tour by American recording artist Bridgit Mendler. Marked as the singer's headlining tour, it supported her debut album, Hello My Name Is.... The tour primarily reached North America.

Background

Mendler played at state fairs and music festivals in the United States and Canada to promote her debut album Hello My Name Is... with the new songs. "Rocks at My Window" and "Hold On for Dear Love" were the only songs from the album not to be performed. She performing two covers songs in the shows, "Animal", originally by Neon Trees, and "This Love", by Maroon 5. She also sang a song from the soundtrack of Lemonade Mouth, "Somebody". 

The tour became a major success with critics and spectators alike, selling out many dates within the United States. Mendler traveled to Canada for three dates with the tour. After the release of her debut studio album, the singer toured alongside Ed Sheeran, Cher Lloyd, Austin Mahone and Owl City for the Jingle Ball's concerts series in United States for the Holiday season.

Setlist
(Not representative of all concerts)
 "Hurricane"
 "Forgot to Laugh"
 "Top of The World"
 "City Lights"
 "This Love" (Maroon 5 cover)
 "All I See Is Gold"
 "The Fall Song"
 "5:15"
 "Animal" (Neon Trees cover)
 "Blonde"
 "Love Will Tell Us Where To Go"
 "Somebody"
Encore
 "Ready or Not"

Tour dates

Notes
Festivals and other miscellaneous performances

A  This concert was a part of the NY State Fair.
B  This performance was part of the line up for Canadian TV station, Family Channel’s Big Ticket Summer concert and TV special. 
C  This concert was a part of the LA County Fair.
D  This concert was a part of the Texas State Fair.
E  This concert was a part of the Topsfield Fair.
F  Monroe Carell Jr. Children’s Hospital Charity Concert.
G  This concert was a part of the Holiday Spectacular.

H  This concert was a part of the Jingle Balls.
I  This concert was a part of the Freecember.
J  This concert was a part of the line up of Canadian TV Station, MuchMusic's, Holiday concert and TV special, The Big Jingle. 
K  This performance was a part of the lineup for the Salvation Army's Rock the Red Kettle charity concert.  
L  This concert was a part of the Johnjay & Rich Christmas Wish Concert.
M  This concert was a part of Canadian TV station, CityTV's, New Year’s Bash TV special.

References

External links
 
 
 Artist site on Disney Music

2012 concert tours
Bridgit Mendler concert tours